Dirk Been (28 December 1914 – 20 May 1978) was a Dutch football defender who was a non-playing squad member for the Netherlands in the 1938 FIFA World Cup.

Club career
He played for hometown side Ajax, but during the Second World War he was forced to work in Germany. There, as a wartime Guest Player, he played for Hamburger SV

References

External links
 FIFA profile
 Ajax stats - Ajax Info 

1914 births
1978 deaths
Footballers from Amsterdam
Dutch footballers
Dutch expatriate footballers
Association football defenders
AFC Ajax players
Hamburger SV players
1938 FIFA World Cup players
Expatriate footballers in Germany
Dutch expatriate sportspeople in Germany
Dutch World War II forced labourers